The Last Plantation is a 1976 Brazilian drama film directed by Marcos Farias. It was entered into the 26th Berlin International Film Festival.

Cast
 Joffre Soares
 Othon Bastos
 Rafael de Carvalho
 Rodolfo Arena
 Ângela Leal
 Fernando Peixoto
 Procópio Mariano
 Alberto Solha
 Mary Neubauer
 Vicentina Amaral
 Marcelo Malta
 José Cavalcanti
 Ari Severo
 Antonio Albuquerque

References

External links

1976 films
Brazilian drama films
1970s Portuguese-language films
1976 drama films